Emeli Sandé is a British singer and songwriter. Following the success of her debut album, Our Version of Events, she has won several awards, including four BRIT Awards and three MOBO Awards. In total, Sandé has received 22 awards from 57 nominations.

BBC Music Awards 
The BBC Music Awards are the annual pop music award presented by the BBC. Sandé has been nominated once.

BBC Radio 1's Teen Awards 
Sandé has been nominated three times.

BET Awards 
The BET Awards are presented annually by Black Entertainment Television. Sandé has one win from three nominations.

Brit Awards 
The Brit Awards are the annual pop music awards by the British Phonographic Industry (BPI). Sandé has four wins from seven nominations.

Echo Music Prize 
The Echo Music Prize was a German music award, presented annually from 1992 to 2018 by German Phono-Akademie, the cultural institute of the German Music Industry Association (BVMI), to recognize outstanding and successful works of national and international music artists. Award winners were determined by representatives of record companies, music publishers, artists, critics, and other professionals within the German music industry. Sandé was nominated twice.

Elle Style Awards 
The Elle Style Awards are an awards ceremony hosted annually by Elle magazine. Sandé has one win from one nomination.

European Border Breakers Award 
The European Border Breakers Award (EBBA) is an annual prize awarded to recognise the success of ten emerging artists or groups who reached audiences outside their own countries with their first internationally released album. Sandé won the award in 2013.

Harper's Bazaar Women of the Year Awards 
Harper’s Bazaar is an American women's fashion magazine published by Hearst. The magazine's Musician of the Year honor was awarded to Sandé in 2012.

Ivor Novello Awards 
The Ivor Novello Awards, named after entertainer Ivor Novello, are awarded for songwriting and composing, presented annually in London by the British Academy of Songwriters, Composers and Authors (BASCA). Sandé has two wins from two nominations.

MOBO Awards 
The Music of Black Origin Awards (MOBO Awards) are held annually in the United Kingdom to recognise artists of any race or nationality who perform black music in genres ranging from Gospel to Jazz, R&B, Soul, Reggae, and Hip-Hop. Sandé has three wins from seven nominations.

MTV Europe Music Award 
The MTV Europe Music Award is an award presented by Viacom International Media Networks to honour artists and music in pop culture. Sandé has one win from one nomination.

NARM Music Biz Awards 
Sandé has one win from one nomination.

Pop Awards 
The Pop Awards are presented annually by Pop Magazine, honoring the best in popular music. Sandé has received three nominations, more than any other artist so far.

Q Awards 
The Q Awards are the UK's annual music awards by music magazine Q, honouring musical excellence. Sandé has won the Q Award for Best Solo Artist in 2012.

Scottish Fashion Awards 
Sandé was nominated for Fashion Icon at the Scottish Fashion Awards in 2012.

Scottish Music Awards 
The Scottish Music Awards are an annual award ceremony held in Scotland to commemorate outstanding musical contribution by musicians over the past year to Scottish music. Sandé won one award.

Silver Clef Awards 
The Silver Clef Awards are an annual music award in the UK. Sandé has one win from one nomination.

Soul Train Music Awards 
The Soul Train Music Awards are an annual award show produced by the makers of Soul Train. Sandé was nominated three times.

Swiss Music Awards 
The Swiss Music Awards are presented by the Press Play Association in conjunction with Media Control Switzerland to national and international artists. Sandé has one win from one nomination.

The Sun Bizarre Award 
Sandé has one win from one nomination.

Teen Choice Awards 
The Teen Choice Awards are an annual awards show, honoring the biggest achievements in music, film, sports, television, fashion, social media, and more. Sandé was nominated twice.

Urban Music Awards 
The Urban Music Awards are a British awards ceremony which recognises the achievement of urban-based artists, producers, nightclubs, DJs, radio stations, and record labels. Sandé has received eleven nominations and won twice.

Virgin Media Music Awards 
Sandé was nominated twice.

References

Lists of awards received by British musician